Dhunche is the administrative seat of Rasuwa District in Bagmati Zone, Nepal. It is a part of Gosaikunda Rural Municipality. At the time of the 2001 Nepal census it had a population of 2,535 people residing in 604 individual households.

To promote local culture Dhunche has one FM radio station, Radio Rasuwa - 102.1 MHz, which is a community radio station.

Dhunche is the headquarters of Rasuwa district. It is accessible through bus via Pasang Lhamu Highway (H12) and is 120 km from Kathmandu.

History

The area was the site of a battle during the second campaign of Sino-Nepalese War in early August 1792.

See also
Rasuwa District

References

Populated places in Rasuwa District